Thomas Ellis Gibson (born July 3, 1962) is an American actor and director. He is best known for his television roles as Daniel Nyland on Chicago Hope (1994–1997), Greg Montgomery on Dharma & Greg (1997–2002) and Aaron Hotchner on Criminal Minds (2005–2016).

Early life
Gibson was born in Charleston, South Carolina, to Charles M. "Mac" and Beth Gibson. His mother was a social worker, and his father was a lawyer and liberal Democrat who served in the South Carolina state Senate and House. He is Catholic. Gibson's interest in the performing arts began at a young age. Gibson was fascinated by Louis Armstrong. He and his sister were on a swim team together, and they frequented a pizza parlor after their swim meets. It was at this pizza parlor that Gibson would sing along with a Dixieland band, complete with his attempt to impersonate Armstrong's singing voice.

As a child, Gibson enrolled in Little Theater School and later graduated from Bishop England High School. He then attended the College of Charleston (1979–1981) and became an intern at the Alabama Shakespeare Festival, where he was encouraged to apply to the Juilliard School. After a year and a half at Charleston, Gibson won a scholarship to Juilliard's Drama Division (Group 14: 1981–1985), where he graduated with a Bachelor of Fine Arts degree in 1985.

Career
Gibson started acting when he was nine years old, in children's theater. He appeared in Julian Wiles' Seize the Street: the Skateboard Musical, a Young Charleston Theater Company (now Charleston Stage) production. As a teenager, he began his classical theater training by becoming a member of the Young Charleston Theater Company and the Footlight Players, often performing at the historic Dock Street Theatre. During his time at College of Charleston, Gibson was an intern at the Alabama Shakespeare Festival. Gibson made his stage debut in David Hare's A Map of the World in the New York Shakespeare Festival. He subsequently appeared in more plays for producer Joe Papp, both in Public Theater and in Central Park. He worked on and off Broadway for the next 10 years in a range of plays by Shakespeare, Christopher Marlowe, Molière, Tennessee Williams, Howard Brenton, Romulus Linney, Noël Coward, and Alan Ball. Gibson also waited tables at Tavern on the Green.

Gibson's first television appearance was in 1987, in a guest role on the legal drama Leg Work, followed by stints on the daytime dramas As the World Turns and Another World. In 1992, Gibson made his movie debut in Ron Howard's Far and Away, in which he portrayed Stephen Chase. Chase was the villainous rival of Joseph Donnelly (Tom Cruise) for Shannon Christie's (Nicole Kidman) affections. His next lead role was in 1993 as David, a gay waiter, in Denys Arcand's Love and Human Remains. Also in 1993, he played bisexual businessman misanthrope Beauchamp Day in the television version of Armistead Maupin's Tales of the City (1993). At the time, Tales of the City was highly controversial for its gay, transgender, bisexual, and drag-queen characters along with nudity, sexual situations, drug use, and explicit language. Gibson later reunited with Arcand in Stardom (2000). Gibson then returned to television, portraying Dr. Danny Nyland on the medical drama Chicago Hope from 1994 to 1998. From 1997 to 2002, Gibson portrayed Greg Montgomery in the sitcom Dharma & Greg, for which he was nominated twice for a Golden Globe Award. After Dharma & Greg, Gibson appeared in various TV movies.

Criminal Minds and exit from the show
In 2005, he was cast as Supervisory Special Agent Aaron "Hotch" Hotchner, the unit chief of the Behavioral Analysis Unit (BAU), in the series Criminal Minds.

On August 11, 2016, Gibson was suspended (after appearing in two episodes of the 12th season of Criminal Minds) following an on-set altercation with a writer-producer; he apologized for the confrontation in a statement, claiming the dispute arose from creative differences in an episode he was directing.

Gibson previously directed six episodes of Criminal Minds since 2013, along with two last season episodes of Dharma & Greg in 2001. Gibson had a prior altercation with an assistant director and had undergone anger-management counseling at that time.

The following day, ABC Studios and CBS Studios (which co-distribute Criminal Minds) issued a statement announcing that Gibson's contract with the series had been terminated. The statement included the information that his character's exit story from the series had yet to be determined. In the October 12, 2016, episode "Taboo", the absence of Gibson's character is explained as being away on special assignment; however, in the episode "Elliot's Pond", it is revealed that he resigned and went into the Witness Protection Program after noticing a serial killer stalking his son.

Personal life
Gibson resides in San Antonio, Texas. His son, Travis Carter, was featured in the Season 10 episode "Boxed In" (#5) of Criminal Minds as a friend of a kidnapped child.  Gibson and his wife Christine separated in 2011, and he filed for divorce in 2014. The divorce was final on February 14, 2018.

Gibson enjoys golf. He plays at the AT&T Pebble Beach Pro-Am every year, as well as other golfing events, and is friends with golfer Corey Pavin. He was part of the 2010 Host Committee for the Inaugural SAG Foundation Golf Classic, and he co-hosted the 2nd Annual SAG Foundation Golf Classic with Criminal Minds castmate Joe Mantegna.

Filmography

Film

Television

As director

Awards and nominations

References

External links
 

1962 births
20th-century American male actors
21st-century American male actors
American male film actors
American male soap opera actors
American male television actors
College of Charleston alumni
Juilliard School alumni
American male voice actors
Living people
Male actors from Charleston, South Carolina
Catholics from South Carolina